Wexham Park Hospital is a large NHS hospital in Slough, Berkshire. It has been managed by Frimley Health NHS Foundation Trust since 2014. Sir Andrew Morris is the Trust's chief executive.

History
The hospital was built on the site of a Victorian mansion known as Wexham Park and was completed in 1965. The design led to an award from the Royal Institute of British Architects. An expanded recovery centre was opened by Sophie Christiansen in June 2013 and a new accident and emergency department opened on 3 April 2019.

Services
The hospital provides services including emergency, trauma and orthopaedic surgery, plastic and reconstructive surgery, paediatric, coronary care and maternity services. It is an associate teaching hospital for the London and Oxford postgraduate medical and dental education organisations. It receives fully qualified nationally appointed trainees who are undertaking postgraduate training in a variety of specialties.

The hospital was founded by pioneering British plastic surgeon Stewart Harrison, who had trained with world-renowned plastic surgeon Harold Gillies. On opening in 1966, the plastic surgery unit rapidly became known as a major UK centre for hand surgery and had the only accredited senior registrar post in hand surgery nationally. In 1949, Harrison and Gillies had performed a pioneering operation to reconstruct the face of a patient born with a congenitally recessed maxilla. This complex operation marked the beginnings of the speciality of craniofacial surgery. Among the observers was French plastic surgeon Paul Tessier, who went on to refine the technique for the treatment of severely deformed children. Harrison, a graduate of the University of Glasgow (MB ChB 1935), was a founding member of the British Society for Surgery of the Hand (BSSH). In 1972, he served as the Society's President. In 1976 he was President of the British Association of Plastic Surgeons, now the British Association of Plastic, Reconstructive and Aesthetic Surgeons (BAPRAS)).

See also
 Healthcare in Berkshire
 List of hospitals in England

References

External links
 Frimley Health NHS Foundation Trust
 British Society for Surgery of the Hand
 British Association of Plastic, Reconstructive and Aesthetic Surgeons

Hospital buildings completed in 1965
Buildings and structures in Slough
NHS hospitals in England
Hospitals in Berkshire